Sivappu Sooriyan is a 1983 Indian Tamil-language action film directed by Muktha Srinivasan, starring Rajinikanth, Radha and Saritha. The film, released on 27 May 1983, was a box office failure.

Plot 

Vijay, a merchant navy officer, comes home on leave to meet his sister Selvi and her husband Vishwanthan but finds them missing. In his search for them, he bumps into Chitra who falls in love with him. With Chitra's help, Vijay is able to find Selvi, but is shocked when he learns that her husband has vanished and she has stopped speaking. Unable to make Selvi speak but determined to resolve her troubles, Vijay with the help of his friend Vidyasagar discovers that Vishwanathan had testified in court against a dangerous criminal and is being held hostage by his associates. Vijay decides to disguise himself as a smuggler and gets into the underworld. Whether he is able to retrieve Vishwanathan and bring normalcy to Selvi's life forms the rest of the story.

Cast 

 Rajinikanth as Vijay
 Radha as Chitra
 Saritha as Selvi
 R. N. Sudarshan as Babu
 Sangili Murugan as Rammohan
 Y. G. Mahendran as Vidhyasagar
 Manorama as Kamalam
 Silk Smitha as Rani
 Radha Ravi as Ravi
 Delhi Ganesh as Vishwanathan
 Vennira Aadai Moorthy as Kamalam's husband
 Thengai Srinivasan as Chithra's father
 V. Gopalakrishnan as Jail Superintendent
 S. R. Sivakami as Chithra's aunt
 Sivachandran as Siva
 LIC Narasimhan as Butcher
 Typist Gopu as Waiter
 Ennatha Kannaiya
 Oru Viral Krishna Rao
 Usilai Mani as Manager
 S. Ramarao
 S. V. Shanmugam Pillai
 M. R. Sulochana

Soundtrack 
The music was composed by M. S. Viswanathan, with lyrics by Vaali.

Reception 
Jayamanmadhan of Kalki panned the film.

References

External links 
 

1980s Tamil-language films
1983 action films
1983 films
Films directed by Muktha Srinivasan
Films scored by M. S. Viswanathan
Indian action films